The 2016 Bol Open was a professional tennis tournament played on outdoor clay courts in Bol, Croatia. The tournament's first edition was held in late April 1991, and then again every year from 1996 to 2003. The tournament returned for 2016 as part of the WTA 125K series.

Singles entrants

Seeds 

 1 Rankings as of 23 May 2016.

Other entrants 
The following players received wildcards into the singles main draw:
  Tereza Mrdeža
  Tena Lukas
  Anna Karolína Schmiedlová
  İpek Soylu
  Ana Vrljić

The following players received entry from the qualifying draw:
  Ekaterina Alexandrova
  Elitsa Kostova
  Marine Partaud
  Isabella Shinikova

The following players received entry as a lucky loser:
  Ani Mijačika

Withdrawals
Before the tournament 
  Denisa Allertová→replaced by Rebecca Peterson
  Kiki Bertens→replaced by Jennifer Brady
  Çağla Büyükakçay→replaced by Ysaline Bonaventure
  Sorana Cîrstea→replaced by Marina Erakovic
  Mariana Duque Mariño→replaced by Julia Glushko
  Kirsten Flipkens →replaced by Ivana Jorović
  Yulia Putintseva →replaced by Paula Kania
  Johanna Larsson →replaced by Petra Martić
  Magda Linette →replaced by Sachia Vickery
  Teliana Pereira →replaced by Kristína Kučová
  Tsvetana Pironkova →replaced by Grace Min

During the tournament
  Rebecca Peterson→replaced by Ani Mijačika

Doubles entrants

Seeds 

 1 Rankings as of May 23, 2016 .

Other entrants 
The following pairs received a wildcard into the doubles main draw:
  Tena Lukas /  Prarthana Thombare
  Ani Mijačika /  Marine Partaud

Champions

Singles 

  Mandy Minella def.  Polona Hercog, 6–2, 6–3

Doubles 

  Xenia Knoll /  Petra Martić def.  Raluca Olaru /  İpek Soylu, 6–3, 6–2

External links 
 Official website

2016 WTA 125K series
2016 in Croatian tennis
Croatian Bol Ladies Open